Griffithsville  is an unincorporated community in eastern Lincoln County, West Virginia, United States.  It lies along West Virginia Route 3 southeast of the town of Hamlin, the county seat of Lincoln County.  Its elevation is 659 feet (201 m).  It has a post office with the ZIP code 25521.

References

Unincorporated communities in Lincoln County, West Virginia